Live at Croydon Fairfield Halls 15/6/75 is a live album by English rock guitarist Paul Kossoff.

Track listing 
All tracks are from Kossoff's solo album or from his former band Back Street Crawler.

 The Band Plays On
Sidekick To the Stars
It's a Long Way Down To the Top
New York New York
Train Song
Survivor
Stealing My Way
All the Girls Are Crazy
Jason Blue
Rock 'N' Roll Junkie
Molten Gold
The Hunter
We Won
Bird Song Blues

1975 live albums
Paul Kossoff albums